Robin Mesarosch (born 1 April 1991) is a German politician of the Social Democratic Party (SPD) who has been serving as a member of the Bundestag since 2021.

Early life and career
Mesarosch was born 1991 in the town of Herrenberg.

Political career
Mesarosch became a member of the Bundestag in the 2021 elections, representing the Zollernalb – Sigmaringen district. In parliament, he has since been serving on the Committee on Digital Affairs and the Committee on Climate Action and Energy.

Within his parliamentary group, Mesarosch belongs to the Parliamentary Left, a left-wing movement.

Other activities
 German Industry Initiative for Energy Efficiency (DENEFF), Member of the Parliamentary Advisory Board
 German United Services Trade Union (ver.di), Member

References

Living people
1991 births
Social Democratic Party of Germany politicians
21st-century German politicians
Members of the Bundestag 2021–2025
People from Herrenberg